The Blue Idol is the eighth studio album by Irish traditional band Altan, released in February 2002 on the Narada label.

Overview
The Blue Idol features guest artists such as Dolly Parton on "The Pretty Young Girl" (which was translated by Mairéad Ní Mhaonaigh's father Proinsias Ó Maonaigh) and Paul Brady on "Daily Growing".

The album was mixed and engineered by nine-time Grammy Award-winner Gary Paczosa

Critical reception
The Blue Idol received a dithyrambic review from Billboard, describing it as «a work of genius» and as «a triumph for Altan and a reminder of the endless charm of Irish music».

Track listing
 "Daily Growing" [song] – 4:53 (also known as "The Trees They Grow High")
 "Uncle Rat" [song] – 2:18
 "Roaring Water" [jig] – 3:15
 "The Pretty Young Girl" [song] – 4:39
 "The Blue Idol" ("The Blue Idol"/"The Butchers March") [jigs] – 3:05
 "The Trip to Cullenstown" ("The Gatehouse Maid"/"The Ashplant"/"The Trip to Cullenstown") [reels] – 3:52
 "Cuach Mo Lon Dubh Buí" [song] – 3:02
 "Mother's Delight" ("Mother's Delight"/"Ormond Sound"/"Mike Hoban's Reel") [reels] – 4:22
 "The Low Highland" ("The Low Highland"/"Moneymusk"/"Duncan Davidson Highlands"/"The Wild Irishman Reel") [highlands and reel] – 3:39
 "The Sea-Apprentice Boy" [song] – 3:50
 "Sláinte Theilinn (A Health to Teelin)" [air] – 4:00
 "An Cailín Deas Óg" [song] – 4:40
 "Gweebarra Bridge" ("Comb Your Hair and Curl It"/"Gweebarra Bridge") [slip-jig and reel] – 3:45

All titles are traditional, with the following exceptions:
"Roaring Water" – composed by Ciaran Tourish and Mark Kelly
"Cuach Mo Lon Dubh Buí" – lyrics traditional, music composed by Mairéad Ní Mhaonaigh
"Sláinte Theilinn – A Health to Teelin" – composed by Mairéad Ní Mhaonaigh

See tune identifications for this album at irishtune.info.

Live performances
Altan played live in concert the following tracks: 
"Uncle Rat"
"The Pretty Young Girl"
"The Blue Idol/The Butchers March"
"An Cailín Deas Óg" 
"Comb Your Hair and Curl It/Gweebarra Bridge".

Personnel

Altan
Mairéad Ní Mhaonaigh – Fiddle, vocals
Ciaran Tourish – Fiddle, whistle, backing vocals
Ciarán Curran – Bouzouki, mandolin
Mark Kelly – Guitar, bouzouki, backing vocals
Dermot Byrne – Accordion
Dáithí Sproule – Guitar, backing vocals

Guest musicians
James Blennerhassett – Bass (track 1, 2)
Paul Brady – Vocals (track 1)
Harry Bradley – Flute (track 5, 8)
Richie Buckley - Saxophone (track 7)
Steve Cooney – Bass (track 11)
Jim Higgins – Bodhrán (tracks 1-3, 5, 6, 8, 9, 11, 13)
Dónal Lunny – Bouzouki (tracks 1, 4, 11, 12), keyboards (track 1)
Neil Martin – Cello (track 11)
Anna Ní Mhaonaigh
Liam O'Flynn – Uillean pipes (track 3)
Dolly Parton – Vocals (track 4)

Production
Gary Paczosa – Engineer
Alistair McMillan – Assistant engineer
Amelia Stein – Band photography
Shaughn McGrath/Four 5 One Design – Design

Notes

References

Altan (band) albums
2002 albums
Narada Productions albums